Free Evangelical Churches is a communion of over 60 regional Evangelical free churches in Greece. The great majority of the churches have the name Free Evangelical Church.  Free Evangelical Churches can be classified among the Baptist and the Plymouth Brethren churches. There are also 3 Greek Free Evangelical Churches in Australia and 2 in Canada.

History
The Free Evangelical Church was founded from a conjunction of various Protestant churches in Greece. This effort was begun in 1886 in Chania, Crete by  two English women who worked in the UK Consulate of Chania. At the same time in Athens  the Church of Christian Brethren was founded by the Irishman Henry Devine. A second church was created in Patras by Theofanis Zaferopoulos, which got help from Swiss Open Brethren. In 1911 Athanasios Katsarkas founded churches in Komotini and Andrianoupolis, while in 1914 they were transported to Thessalonica, and afterwards they also expanded  into other regions. In Athens the main worker of the Free Evangelical Church was Kostas Metallinos. It is believed that Kostas Metallinos was the main founder of the Communion.

External links
New Life Evangelical Church
Free Evangelical Church of Heraklion
Chaidari Free Evangelical Church - Greek
Free Evangelical Youth - Greek
Independent Evangelical Church - Greek 
Komotini Free Evangelical Church - Greek 
Peristeri Free Evangelical Church - Greek
Trikala Church - Greek
Free Evangelical Church of Glyfada - Greek

Protestantism in Greece
Anabaptist denominations